Ashwini Vaishnaw (born 18 July 1970) is an Indian politician and former IAS officer currently serving as the Minister of Railways, Communications and Electronics & Information Technology in Government of India, since 8 July 2021. He is a member of the Bharatiya Janata Party. In June 2019, he became a member of the Parliament of India representing Odisha State in the Rajya Sabha, the upper house. On 7 July 2021, he was appointed as a Cabinet  Minister and was given the charge of Railways and Information Technology ministries. Earlier in 1994, Vaishnaw joined the Indian Administrative Service in the Odisha cadre, and has worked extensively in Odisha. Vaishnaw was born in a Hindu Swami (Bairagi Brahmin) Family.

Education and work 
He is originally a resident of Jeewand Kallan village of Rani in Pali District, Rajasthan; and later his family settled in Jodhpur.

Vaishnaw did his schooling at St. Anthony's Convent School, Jodhpur, and at Mahesh School, Jodhpur. He graduated from MBM Engineering College (JNVU) Jodhpur in 1991 with a gold medal in an electronic and communications engineering course and then completed his M.Tech from IIT Kanpur, before joining the Indian Administrative Services in 1994 with an all-India rank of 27. In 2008, Vaishnaw left for the US to do his MBA from Wharton School of the University of Pennsylvania.

After his MBA, Vaishnaw came back to India and joined GE Transportation as Managing Director. Subsequently, he joined Siemens as the Vice President - Locomotives & Head Urban Infrastructure Strategy. Previously, he has also worked as deputy chairman of the Mormugao Port Trust, and thus has experience in both public and private sector enterprises.

In 2012, he quit the corporate sector and joined Three Tee Auto Logistics Private Limited and Vee Gee Auto Components Private Limited, both automotive components manufacturing units in Gujarat.

Years in civil services  
In 1994, Vaishnaw joined the Indian Administrative Service in the Odisha cadre, and has worked extensively in different parts of Odisha including serving as the District Collector of Balasore and Cuttack districts. At the time of super cyclone 1999, he managed to collect data related to real timing and place of cyclone, by collecting that data Government of Odisha took safety measurements for people of Odisha.
 He worked in Odisha till 2003 when he was appointed as deputy secretary in the office of former Prime Minister Atal Bihari Vajpayee. After his brief stint in the PMO where he contributed to creating the public-private-partnership framework in infrastructure projects, Vaishnav was appointed as Vajpayee's private secretary after the BJP-led NDA lost the election in 2004.

In 2006, he became deputy chairman of Mormugao Port Trust, where he worked for next two years.

He took an educational loan to complete his MBA at the Wharton Business School. He realized that it would take him years to payback the educational loan and eventually left civil service in 2010 to join private sector.

Political career 

Vaishnaw is currently a Member of Indian Parliament, representing Odisha state in the Rajya Sabha. He won the Rajya Sabha election unopposed with the help of Biju Janata Dal members in Odisha. Vaishnaw was appointed as member of Committee on Subordinate Legislation and Petitions and Committee on Science and Technology, Environment and Forests.

Vaishnaw has argued in Parliament that the current economic slowdown is cyclical in nature and is not a structural slowdown and that it is likely to bottom out by March and would be followed by solid growth. Vaishnaw firmly believes that the way to build the country is to put the money in investment rather than putting money in consumption.

Vaishnaw has also supported the Taxation Laws (Amendment) Bill, 2019 on 5 December 2019 in Rajya Sabha. He believes the step of reducing or rather rationalizing the tax structure will increase the competitiveness of the Indian industry and will also develop the capital base of the Indian industry. While supporting he further argued that the particular rationalization of tax structure will help the corporates to de-leverage and increase the retained earnings and reserves and surplus which will lay the foundation of the structural growth of the economy.

Apart from these, he has also spoken on issues ranging from Ship Recycling Bill to Women Protection in Rajya Sabha to further the public discourse on those issues.

Cabinet Minister
In July 2021, in the 22nd cabinet reshuffle, he was given the responsibility of Ministry of Railways, Ministry of Electronics and Information Technology and Ministry of Communications.

References

External links
 
 

Living people
Indian Administrative Service officers
Rajya Sabha members from Odisha
Bharatiya Janata Party politicians from Odisha
People from Gurgaon
Wharton School of the University of Pennsylvania alumni
1970 births